Marorka is a company which specializes in marine energy management. Marorka's head office is in Reykjavik, Iceland along with its servers and data storage infrastructure are supplied with electricity generated using 100% renewable energy resources – geothermal and hydroelectric. Marorka has international offices in Dubai, London and Shanghai. Mororka has an ISO 9001:2000 quality system, and is certified by Det Norske Veritas.

Mission
Marorka's mission is to deliver products and services to vessel owners and operators to save fuel, increase profitability and reduce harmful emissions. The company was founded in June 2002 and resulted from the PhD thesis of Jón Ágúst Thorsteinsson, Entrepreneur and founder.

Systems
Marorka has developed reliable, automated, on-board and online energy management systems for the international shipping industry. Marorka's products and services enable vessel operators to optimize fuel consumption by maximizing the energy efficiency of their vessels through the implementation of real-time monitoring and decision support, which are essential components of any operational optimization process. Marorka's systems have been installed on board vessels of various types and sizes; Fishing vessels, Cargo vessels, Bulk carriers, LNG carriers, Cruise ships and Research vessels.

Overview of work
Marorka's field of work:
 consultancy for vessel building
 operational analysis of ocean vessels
 development of Marorka Onboard (energy management system), the  marine energy management system
 development of Marorka Online and Marorka Online SEEMP

Recognition
In 2008, Marorka received the Nordic Council Environment Prize.  37 companies were nominated for the award.

See also
Marine Energy Management
Fuel efficiency
Energy Engineering

References

Villemes, Katinka. Nature and Environment Prize 2008 goes to Iceland, norden.org, October 10, 2008 
Wilson-Roberts, Guy. Green award for emissions-reducing technology, Sustainable Shipping News, October 28, 2008 
World Fishing

External links
Marorka's website

Electric power companies of Iceland
Energy conservation
Software companies of Iceland
Companies established in 2002
2002 establishments in Iceland
Companies based in Reykjavík